The following are the winners of the 5th annual (1978), Origins Award, presented at Origins 1979.

Charles Roberts Awards

The H.G. Wells Awards

Adventure Gaming Hall of Fame Inductee
 John Hill

References

External links
 1978 Origins Awards Winners

1978 awards
Origins Award winners
1978 awards in the United States